The Lieutenant of the Tower of London serves directly under the Constable of the Tower. The office has been appointed at least since the 13th century. There were formerly many privileges, immunities and perquisites attached to the office. Like the Constable, the Lieutenant was usually appointed by letters patent, either for life or during the King's pleasure.

The Lieutenants had custody of many eminent prisoners of state, including Anne Boleyn, Sir Thomas More, Lady Jane Grey, Princess Elizabeth (later Queen Elizabeth I) and Sir Walter Raleigh. At least five of the Lieutenants, Sir Edward Warner, Sir Gervase Helwys, Isaac Penington, Colonel Robert Tichborne, and Sir Edward Hales, themselves later became prisoners in the Tower.

History
The earliest known Lieutenant was Giles de Oudenard at the beginning of the reign of Edward I, while Anthony Bek, later Bishop of Durham, was Constable. The next recorded Lieutenant was Ralph Bavant, who served during John de Crumwell's tenure as Constable.

Holders of the office; pre-1500
 1239: Giles de Oudenard
 1327: Ralph Bavant 
 1415: Sir Roger Aston 
 1420:
 1424: Sir Robert Scott 
 1471: Richard Haute 
 1485: Sir John Digby

Holders of the office; 1500 to 1600

Holders of the office; 1600 to 1700

Holders of the office since 1700

Deputy Lieutenants

Notes

References
 
 
 
 
 
 
 
 
 
 

 

Tower of London